The Murwillumbah railway line is a mostly disused railway line in far north-eastern Northern Rivers New South Wales, Australia. The line ran from Casino to Lismore, Byron Bay, Mullumbimby and Murwillumbah, opening in 1894. It is one of only two branches off the North Coast line, (the other being the Dorrigo line). Train services to the region ceased in May 2004. The line from Casino to Bentley and Murwillumbah to Crabbes Creek was formally closed on 23 September 2020 to facilitate the construction of a rail trail.

The Byron Bay Train operates over a short three kilometre section of the track in Byron Bay. It is widely considered to be the world's first solar-powered train.

History

The first section opened between Lismore and Murwillumbah, connecting the Richmond and Tweed rivers. Passengers and goods were transported to Sydney by coastal shipping from Byron Bay. Nine years later, an extension from Lismore to Casino opened (and later south to Grafton - it was not until 1932 that the line was fully connected to Sydney). As early as 1889, feasibility talks took place into extending the line north from Murwillumbah into Queensland, discussions that continue to the present day. The line became a branch line when in 1930, the North Coast Line was extended from Kyogle to South Brisbane.

Services
The North Coast Mail was the premier train between Murwillumbah and Sydney after the North Coast line was completed in the 1930s.
 
Additional local trains plied the tracks between Casino and Murwillumbah, connecting with other services such as the Brisbane Express and Brisbane Limited. The 3 km extension from Murwillumbah station to Condong was for sugar mill traffic. 620/720 class railcars also worked this line (set 638/738, which was specially modified, and also hauled a small van). The line to Condong Sugar Mill used to run over a section of the old Pacific Highway (now Tweed Valley Way) - when cane trains would unload, they blocked north and southbound traffic, disgruntling some impatient motorists. The level crossing was removed following the closure of the old sugar mill and subsequently, the trains did not travel any further than Murwillumbah station from 1975 onwards.

From 1973, the Gold Coast Motorail provided passenger and car transport between Sydney and Murwillumbah, along with the introduction of the North Coast Overnight Express in 1978 to meet increasing popular demand. 

In February 1990, the Gold Coast Motorail and North Coast Overnight Express were replaced by an unnamed CountryLink XPT that ran primarily as a night service to the region, severely reducing its own capability of serving the communities that the line ran through. The replacement of these two services reduced total seating capacity from 1,600 to only 434 - resulting in a drop of patronage.

In September 1997, FreightCorp contracted out of the operation of freight trains on the line to Northern Rivers Railroad. These services ceased in 2002. Freight traffic primarily consisted of bananas and flyash from Wyee. In May 1999, a tourist service called Ritz Rail was introduced. This train was stationed at Murwillumbah and was ordered off the Murwillumbah line in 2002 by the NSW Government, eliminating any tourist service on the line.

In April 2004, the NSW Government closed the railway line after advising that it was unprofitable to continue providing services to Murwillumbah particularly due to lack of full fare patronage. On 15 May 2004, the last XPT train left Murwillumbah station, putting an end to 110 years of rail transport in the region.

As of 2021 the line remains closed and disused, with the exception of a solar powered 660/720 series railmotor which operates a shuttle tourist service on the line in Byron Bay.

Ballina Branch
In 1930, a branch opened between Booyong and the town of Ballina. In 1948, flood damage and landslips saw services suspended on the line, and it was officially closed in 1953.

Proposed extension
When Queensland's South Coast line reached Tweed Heads in 1903, there were immediate calls from local Members of the Parliament of New South Wales to extend the Murwillumbah line another  to Tweed Heads so the two railways could meet. The Parliamentary Standing Committee on Public Works Committee examined the proposal but narrowly voted against it in 1904. There were three other proposals to extend the railway to Tweed Heads before the idea was dropped in 1928.

A 1994 study by Kearney – Sinclair Knight for the State Rail Authority of NSW entitled 'Review of Investment Options – Casino to Murwillumbah line' did not favour the extension of the line to Robina. It found the mooted connecting line between Robina in the Gold Coast and Murwillumbah would merely reinforce this existing poor targeting of the service and that "...the present population density in the area is too low to provide adequate benefit to cost ratios on investments in the line.

In 2011, the NSW Department of Transport commissioned a feasibility study to reopen the Murwillumbah line, including to extend rail services in northern NSW to connect with the Queensland Rail system and Coolangatta Airport. The feasibility report was released in April 2013 and concluded it would take $952 million to bring the line back to a required standard (over $7 million per km).

Current state of railway

The line is completely disused apart from the 3 km section north of Byron Bay used by the Byron Bay Railroad Company. The line has had very little maintenance since the last train service ran on 15 May 2004. There are many wooden bridges and structures which have been removed because of safety concerns. The stations at Lismore and Murwillumbah are now unstaffed.

Current use of railway

A heritage rail shuttle service began operations in Byron Bay in December 2017. The section of track to the north of the town centre has been fully restored by private investment at a cost of about $300,000 per kilometre. Track work on the section commenced on 23 May 2016 and was completed in late November 2016. A two car self-propelled diesel rail car train (661/726) has been refurbished by the Lithgow State Mine Heritage Park & Railway. This restoration was completed in 2015. New platforms and a storage shed were completed in April 2017. The train arrived in Byron Bay on 3 November 2017. It was officially confirmed in early January 2017 the train would run on solar-hybrid operation, making it the world's first solar-powered train.

On Thursday 11 January 2018, Byron Bay Railroad Company announced they had taken over 10,000 passengers on the train, just 19 days after service began. One year later, that number had increased to 100,000.

Future uses of railway
The line is not included in the Northern Rivers Regional Transport Plan.

Byron Line proposal

On 25 August 2016, The Byron Line proposal was announced by Byron Shire Mayor Simon Richardson. The Byron Line is a proposal including the refurbishment of the rail line from Bangalow to Billinudgel for light rail or rail shuttle services to be used by the local community and tourists. It was to investigate construction of a rail trail beside the tracks, where practicable. A feasibility study on this is to be the basis for seeking State funding. In June 2019 the report was released, which estimated the cost of restoring the track for a hi-rail or very light-rail service and placing a mixed use path alongside it - where that was possible - at between $30 million and $60 million. 

Rail Trail proposal

There is a proposal for the line to be converted to a rail trail from Casino to Murwillumbah, in an attempt to boost tourism to the villages and towns along the line, to provide a safe riding and walking trail for all ages away from the main roads while respecting and educating about the lines historical significance.  . On 19 June 2015, the Rail Trail proposal missed out on state funding. A 2.6 km pilot Rail Trail section has begun from Murwillumbah railway station to the Tweed River Art Gallery and Margaret Olley Art Centre is supported by Tweed Shire Council due to its existing Public Transport Strategy.

Stage one of the proposal is for a 24 kilometre 'Tweed Valley Rail Trail', stretching from Murwillumbah railway station to the Tweed Shire border at Crabbes Creek. On 17 July 2017, The NSW State Government announced $6,300,000 to fund half of the proposed Rail Trail. This funding is conditional on the Federal Government matching the commitment of $6.3 million towards the Rail Trail to fully fund the $12.6 million venture. On 10 August 2017, it was confirmed the Rail Trail proposal missed out on Federal funding. The NSW Government subsequently withdrew their offer. This was the third time the Rail Trail proposal had failed to attract funding at both State and Federal levels.

In early 2018 the NSW State Government and Federal Government agreed to fund the 24km Murwillumbah to Crabbes Creek Rail Trail proposal with each contributing $6.5 million to fund the $13 million project. Tweed Shire Council is developing the Trail, with the design for a rail trail on the rail formation but with the possibility of bids to construct it off-formation.

On 17 June 2021, Tweed Shire Council voted  to accept a tender to construct the 24km Tweed Valley Rail Trail on-formation. The Council had prior voted both on-formation and off-formation construction bids, however during confidential session it was revealed a caveat on the funding allegedly prohibited off-formation construction. This caveat had not been disclosed to Council or the community prior to the 17 June meeting.

The Northern Rivers Rail Trail raised $60,000 in crowd funding to undertake feasibility on design work on stage two of the rail trail from Casino to the village of Eltham. The Casino to Bentley Rail Trail is the first component of the $33 million Casino to Eltham project. The sections of railway line from Casino to Bentley and Crabbes Creek to Condong were formally closed by NSW Parliament in September 2020 to facilitate the first two stages of the Rail Trail project.

The issue has remained controversial in the area as to the potential benefits to the community and the usage of remaining rail infrastructure. Those who support the proposal believe a safe rail trail running on the track formation where possible would increase eco tourism, provide significant safety and health benefits to cyclists and walkers all ages and preserve the historical significance of the railway corridor. On the other hand, rail advocates believe that it would spell complete and permanent destruction of the railway infrastructure and would lead to the private sale of the railway corridor and the elimination of any future possibility of train services returning to the region.

Gallery

References

Further reading
The Byron Line, June 2016

External links
Northern Rivers Rail Trail
North Byron Beach Resort - Byron Bay Train
Byron Bay Train

Murwillumbah railway line
Closed regional railway lines in New South Wales
Northern Rivers
Railway lines opened in 1894
Railway lines closed in 2020
Standard gauge railways in Australia